Amorino may refer to:

 Palazzo Bolognini Amorini Salina, a Renaissance architecture palace in the center of Bologna, Italy
 Paolo Amorini (born 1937), Italian rower
 A putto representing a cupid

See also 
 Amorino (disambiguation)